Garth Houchen (September 1930 – 10 April 2021) was a British Labour Party politician who served as the 3rd Mayor of Redcar & Cleveland from 1998–9. He was the 69th mayor of the borough.

During his tenure as mayor, he campaigned for a new bridge in the village of Marske-by-the-Sea, and served as a trustee for the Tees Heritage Trust.

See also
 Redcar and Cleveland Borough Council

References

1930 births
2021 deaths
Councillors in North East England

People from Redcar and Cleveland